Lemkos are an ethnic group inhabiting the Lemko Region of Carpathian Rus', an ethnographic region in the Carpathian Mountains and foothills spanning Ukraine, Slovakia and Poland.

They are considered to be a sub-group of Rusyns (also called Carpatho-Rusyns or Carpatho-Ruthenians). Other Carpathian sub-ethnic groups identifying as Rusyns include the Boykos and Hutsuls. Members of these groups have historically also been given other designations such as Verkhovyntsi (Highlanders). Among people of the Carpathian highlands, communities speaking the same dialect will identify with a different ethnic label when crossing borders due to the influence of state-sponsored education and media. As well the same community may switch its preferred identification over time. In Slovakia between the 1991 and 2001 censuses, the number of people identifying as "Ukrainian" declined by 2,467 people (an 18.6% decrease) while those reporting Rusyn as their national identity increased by 7,004 people (a 40.6% increase). It is not clear however, if this refers to the same individuals switching their identification, more young first-time respondents choosing Rusyn, or migration. Note that "Lemko" was not an option on the Slovak census, and many Rusyn-identifying Slovak citizens would be part of other subgroups besides the Lemkos.

The spoken language of the Lemkos, which has a code of rue under ISO 639-3, has been variously described as a language in its own right, a dialect of Rusyn or a dialect of Ukrainian. In Ukraine, almost all Lemkos speak both Lemko and standard Ukrainian (according to the 2001 Ukrainian Census). Ukraine (unlike neighboring countries) denies Lemkos separate ethnic and linguistic status. In the Polish Census of 2011, 11,000 people declared Lemko nationality, of whom 6,000 declared only Lemko nationality, 4,000 declared double national identity – Lemko-Polish, and 1,000 declared Lemko identity together with a non-Polish identity.

Etymology
The ethnonym Lemko derives from the word . The term is thought to have first originated as a nickname for users of the word lem in the borderlands between the Lemko and Boyko regions: the easternmost extent of usage of the word on the north side of the Carpathians. (On the south side of the Carpathians, the analogous nickname, lemak, was used in the lem-lyš isogloss area.) The ethnonym eventually entered use in academia and was first recorded in print with the 1834 publication of Grammatik der ruthenischen oder klein russischen Sprache in Galizien (lit. 'Grammar of Ruthenian or Little Russian Language in Galicia') by Yosyp Levytsky.

As an endonym, Lemko only entered wider use in the early 20th century. Prior to adopting the name, Lemkos would refer to themselves as Rusyns or Rusnaks. By the interwar period the popularity of Lemko as an endonym had grown, and appeared in periodicals such as Lemko and Naš Lemko.

Polish authorities also played a  hand in popular adoption of the term  leading up to World War II. Concerned by the potential for Ukrainian nationalism in the region, authorities sought to encourage Rusyn identity as a counter. This led to promotion of the exaggerated historicity of Lemkos as a distinctive ethnographic group and of their corresponding ethnonym.

In the aftermath of WWII, Lemko finally supplanted Rusyn and Rusnak as the term of choice for the Rusyns on the north face of the Carpathians in Poland.

History

Several hypotheses account for the origin of the Lemkos, however, like all Rusyns, they most probably have a diverse ethnogenetic origin. The Lemkos (and other Carpatho-Rusyns) are considered to be descendants of the medieval White Croats, affected by the migration of Rusyn-influenced Slovaks, and the Vlach/Romanian migrations in the 14th and 15th centuries.

The Lemko Region became part of Poland in the time of the medieval Piast dynasty but was frequently disputed with the neighbouring Rus', as can be seen by taking the town of Sanok as an example: In 981CE Vladimir I of Kiev invaded the area and took it over from Poland. In 1018 it returned to Poland, in 1031 it went back to Rus', and in 1340 Casimir III of Poland recovered it for Poland. The gord of Sanok is mentioned for the first time in Hypatian Codex in 1150.

Lemkos (or their progenitors) became an ethnic minority as part of the Austrian province of Galicia in 1772. Mass emigration from this territory to the Western hemisphere for economic reasons began in the late 19th century. After World War I, Lemkos founded two short-lived republics, the Lemko-Rusyn Republic in the west of Galicia, which had a russophile orientation, and the Komancza Republic, with a Ukrainophilic orientation.

It is estimated that about 130,000 to 140,000 Lemkos were living in the Polish part of the Lemko Region in 1939. Depopulation of these lands occurred during the forced resettlement, initially to the Soviet Union (about 90,000 people) and later to Poland's newly acquired western lands (about 35,000) in the Operation Vistula campaign of the late 1940s. This action was a state ordered removal of the civilian population, in a counter-insurgency operation to remove potential support for guerrilla war being waged by the Ukrainian Insurgent Army (UPA) in south-eastern Poland.

Some 5,000 Lemko families returned to their home regions in Poland between 1957 and 1958, (they were officially granted the right to return in 1956), the Lemko population in the Polish section of Lemkivschyna only numbers around 10,000–15,000 today. Some 50,000 Lemkos live in the western and northern parts of Poland, where they were sent to populate former German villages in areas ceded to Poland. Among those, 5,863 people identified themselves as Lemko in the 2002 census. However, 60,000 ethnic Lemkos may reside in Poland today. Within the Lemko Region, Lemkos live in the villages of Łosie, Krynica-Zdrój, Nowica, Zdynia, Gładyszów, Hańczowa, Zyndranowa, Uście Gorlickie, Bartne, Binczarowa and Bielanka. Additional populations can be found in Mokre, Szczawne, Kulaszne, Rzepedź, Turzańsk, Komańcza, Sanok, Nowy Sącz, and Gorlice.

In 1968 an open-air museum dedicated to Lemko culture was opened in Zyndranowa. Additionally, a Lemko festival is held annually in Zdynia.

Religion

An important aspect of Lemko culture is their deep commitment to Byzantine Christianity which was introduced to the Eastern Slavs from Byzantium via Moravia through the efforts of Saints Cyril and Methodius in the 9th century. Originally the Lemkos adhered to Orthodoxy, but in order to avoid latinization, directly entered into Union of Brest with the Roman Catholic Church in the 17th century.

Most Lemkos today are Eastern rite or Byzantine-rite Catholics. In Poland they belong to the Ukrainian Greek Catholic Church with a Roman Catholic minority, or to the Ruthenian Catholic Church (see also Slovak Greek Catholic Church) in Slovakia. A substantial number belong to the Eastern Orthodox Church. Through the efforts of the martyred priest Father Maxim Sandovich (canonized by the Polish Orthodox Church in the 1990s), in the early 20th century, Eastern Orthodoxy was reintroduced to many Lemko areas which had accepted the Union of Brest centuries before.

The distinctive wooden architectural style of the Lemko churches is to place the highest cupola of the church building at the entrance to the church, with the roof sloping downward toward the sanctuary as opposed to their neighbouring sub-ethnic groups such as the Boykos who place the highest cupola in the middle. Both groups styles have three cupola with numerous eaves.

Language/dialect

The Slavic dialects of Central Europe form (or formed, prior to standardization) a dialect continuum with few distinct boundaries between neighbouring varieties. However the question of language boundaries has become a controversial political issue since the dissolution of the Austro-Hungarian Empire and later the Soviet Union into "nation states", each having only one official language. The Lemko dialects share many features with other Carpathian ones, which are often grouped together as the Rusyn language by outside linguists.

The Lemko dialect has been influenced greatly by the languages spoken by geographically neighboring peoples and ruling elites, so much so that some consider it a separate entity.Lemko speech includes some patterns matching those of the surrounding Polish and Slovak languages, leading some to refer to it as a transitional dialect between Polish and Slovak (some even consider the dialect in Eastern Slovakia to be a dialect of the Slovak language).

Metodyj Trochanovskij developed a Lemko Primer (Bukvar: Perša knyžečka dlja narodnŷch škol, 1935) and a First Reader (Druha knyžečka dlja narodnŷch škol, 1936) for use in schools in the Lemko-speaking area of Poland. In 1934, Lemko was introduced as the language of instruction in schools in the Lemko region. The pupils were taught from textbooks prepared by Trochanovskij and published by the State Publishing House. However, shortly before the outbreak of World War II Polish authorities replaced them with Ukrainian texts. Important fieldwork on the Lemko dialect was carried out by the Polish linguist Zdzisław Stieber before their dispersal.

According to the Central Statistical Office of Poland, in the school year 2010–2011, Lemko was taught as a first language in twenty primary schools and interschool groups, and ten schools and interschool groups at junior high level, with 188 students attending classes.

In the late 20th century, some Lemkos/Rusyns, mainly emigres from the region of the southern slopes of the Carpathians in modern-day Slovakia, began codifying a standard grammar for the Lemko dialect, which was presented on the 27 January 1995 in Prešov, Slovakia. In 2013 the famous novel The Little Prince was translated into Lemko by Petro Krynyckij.

Lemkos in fiction
Nikolai Gogol's short story The Terrible Vengeance ends at Kriváň, now in Slovakia and pictured on the Slovakian euro, in the heart of the Lemko Region in the Prešov Region. Avram Davidson makes several references to the Lemko people in his stories. Anna Bibko, mother-in-law of the protagonist of All Shall Be Well; and All Shall Be Well; and All Manner of Things Shall Be Well, is a Lemko "guided by her senses of traditionalism and grievance, not necessarily in that order".

In the critically acclaimed movie The Deer Hunter the wedding reception scene was filmed in Lemko Hall in the Tremont neighborhood of Cleveland, Ohio, which had a significant immigrant population of Lemkos at one time. The three main characters’ surnames, however, appear to be Russian, possibly Polish and Ukrainian (Michael "Mike" Vronsky, from Polish Wroński, Steven Pushkov, and Nikonar "Nick" Chevotarevich) and the wedding was filmed inside St. Theodosius Russian Orthodox Cathedral, which is also located in Tremont.

Location

The Lemkos' homeland is commonly referred to as the Lemko Region. Up until 1945, this included the area from the Poprad River in the west to the valley of Oslawa River in the east, areas situated primarily in present-day Poland, in the Lesser Poland and Subcarpathian Voivodeships (provinces). This part of the Carpathian mountains is mostly deforested, which allowed for an agrarian economy, alongside such traditional occupations as ox grazing and sheep herding.

The Lemko region became part of Poland in medieval Piast times. Lemkos were made part of the Austrian province of Galicia in 1772. This area was part of the Austro-Hungarian Empire until its dissolution in 1918, at which point the Lemko-Rusyn Republic (Ruska Lemkivska) declared its independence. Independence did not last long however, and the republic was incorporated into Poland in 1920.

As a result of the forcible deportation of Ukrainians from Poland to the Soviet Union after World War II, the majority of Lemkos in Poland were either resettled from their historic homeland to the prеviously German territories in the North-Western region of Poland or to the Ukrainian Soviet Socialist Republic. Only those Lemkos living the Prešov Region in present-day Slovakia continue to live on their ancestral lands, with the exception of some Lemkos who resettled in their homeland in the late 1950s and afterward. Lemkos are/were neighbours with Slovaks, Carpathian Germans and Lachy sądeckie (Poles) to the west, Pogorzans (Poles) and Dolinians (a Rusyn subgroup) to the north, Ukrainians to the east, and Slovaks to the south.

Notable Lemkos
 Bohdan Ihor Antonych, poet
 Mary Beck, Detroit politician
 Thomas Bell, American novelist
 Emil Czyrniański, chemist
 Oleksandr Dukhnovych, writer
 Bill Evans, American jazz pianist and composer
 , Lemko activist, creator of the Lemko Culture Museum in Zyndranowa 
 , musician
 Misia Furtak, musician
 Andrew Kay, inventor of the digital voltmeter (1953), and inductee of the Computer Hall of Fame for founding Kaypro Computer
 Nina Petrovna Khrushcheva, wife of Soviet leader Nikita Khrushchev
 Ivan Krasovs'kyi, Lemko ethnographer/historian
 Volodymyr Kubiyovych, Ukrainian geographer
 Seman Madzelan, Lemko writer and activist
 Adrian Mikhalchishin, Ukrainian chessmaster
 , Ukrainian politician, member of Ukrainian party Svoboda, son of Adrian Mikhalchishin
 Nikifor, painter
 Maxim Sandovich, Orthodox saint
 Andrij Savka aka Andrew Sawka, bandit, folk hero, Lemko "Robin Hood", led peasant revolution in 1651
 Khrystyna Soloviy, Ukrainian folk singer
 George Stroumboulopoulos, Canadian television personality with Ukrainian-born mother
 Petro Murianka (Piotr Trochanowski), Lemko poet, involved with contemporary Lemko issues
 Metodyj Trochanovskij, Lemko grammarian
 Andy Warhol (birth name Warhola), American artist, major figure in the pop art movement
 James Warhola, American artist
 John Warhola, American artist
 Julia Warhola, American artist

See also

 Besida
 Boyko
 Carpathian Ruthenia
 Green Ukraine republic
 History of Ukraine
 Hutsuls
 Lemko Republic
 Muzeum Budownictwa Ludowego w Sanoku
 Red Ruthenia
 Rusyn American
 Rusyn language
 Rusyns
 Ruthenia
 Ruthenians
 Shlakhtov Ruthenians
 Siberian Republic
 Ukraine
 Ukrainians
 White Croatia

Notes

References

Further reading
 Moklak, Jaroslaw. The Lemko Region in the Second Polish Republic: Political and Interdenominational Issues 1918--1939 (2013); covers Old Rusyns, Moscophiles and National Movement Activists, & the political role of the Greek Catholic and Orthodox Churches
 Łemkowie Grupa Etniczna czy Naród?, [The Lemkos: An Ethnic Group or a Nation?], trans. 
 The Lemkos of Poland – Articles and Essays, editor Paul Best and Jarosław Moklak
 The Lemko Region, 1939–1947 War, Occupation and Deportation – Articles and Essays, editor Paul Best and Jarosław Moklak
 
 
 Лемкiвскiй календар. (Lemkivskiĭ kalendar)
 
 
 Gocz T., Życie Łemka / Teodor Gocz. - wyd. II, poprawione i uzupełnione. - Zyndranowa - Krosno : Oficyna Wydawnicza "APLA", 2007. - 142 s.
 Drozd R., Halczak B. Dzieje Ukraińców w Polsce w latach 1921–1989 / Roman Drozd, Bohdan Halczak. – wyd. II, poprawione. – Warszawa : TYRSA, 2010. – 237 s.
 Halczak B. Publicystyka narodowo – demokratyczna wobec problemów narodowościowych i etnicznych II Rzeczypospolitej / Bohdan Halczak. – Zielona Góra : Wydaw. WSP im. Tadeusza Kotarbińskiego, 2000. – 222 s.
 Halczak B. Problemy tożsamości narodowej Łemków / Bohdan Halczak // W: Łemkowie, Bojkowie, Rusini: historia, współczesność, kultura materialna i duchowa / red. nauk. Stefan Dudra, Bohdan Halczak, Andrzej Ksenicz, Jerzy Starzyński . – Legnica – Zielona Góra : Łemkowski Zespół Pieśni i Tańca "Kyczera", 2007 – s. 41–55 .
 Halczak B. Łemkowskie miejsce we wszechświecie. Refleksje o położeniu Łemków na przełomie XX i XXI wieku / Bohdan Halczak // W: Łemkowie, Bojkowie, Rusini – historia, współczesność, kultura materialna i duchowa / red. nauk. Stefan Dudra, Bohdan Halczak, Roman Drozd, Iryna Betko, Michal Šmigeľ . Tom IV, cz. 1 . – Słupsk – Zielona Góra : [b. w.], 2012 – s. 119–133 .
 Дрозд Р., Гальчак Б. Історія українців у Польщі в 1921–1989 роках / Роман Дрозд, Богдан Гальчак, Ірина Мусієнко; пер. з пол. І. Мусієнко. 3-тє вид., випр., допов. – Харків : Золоті сторінки, 2013. – 272 с.
 
 
 
 
 
 
 
 
 
 Patrycja Trzeszczyńska, "Bridges to the past: a Lemko family history explored through letters. An ethnographic case study," Canadian Slavonic Papers 60, no. 1-2 (2018)

External links

 Lemko Portal in Ukraine
 Canadian Lemko Association
 Lemko revival in Poland
 The Zarzad Glowny Zjednoczenia Lemkow w Polsce (Lemko-Ukrainian Union in Poland)
 Lemko.org
 Stowarzyszenie Łemków (Association of Lemkos)
 Lemko Portal in Lviv
 "The Lemko Project" - A blog and resource site about Lemko history, culture and events. English language.
 Ukraine Lemko ethno folk group
 "The bells of Lemkivshchyna. Will the authorities of Ukraine and Poland listen to them", Zerkalo Nedeli, (Mirror Weekly), May 25–31, 2002. Available online in Russian and in Ukrainian.
 "Five questions for a Lemko", Zerkalo Nedeli, (Mirror Weekly), January 19–25, 2002. Available online in Russian and in Ukrainian.
 Metodyj Trochanovskij
 Lemko Portal in Poland

 
Ethnic groups in Poland
Ethnic groups in Slovakia
Ethnic groups in Ukraine
Lemko Region
Slavic ethnic groups
Slavic highlanders
Ukrainian words and phrases